Schomberg or Schömberg may refer to various people or places:

Places

In Canada
Schomberg, Ontario, an unincorporated village
Schomberg (Sloan Field) Aerodrome

In Germany
Schömberg, Thuringia, in the district of Greiz, Thuringia
Schömberg, Zollernalbkreis, in the district Zollernalbkreis, Baden-Württemberg
Schömberg, Calw, in the district of Calw, Baden-Württemberg

In Poland
Schomberg, German name for Szombierki, a district of Bytom
Schömberg, the former German name for Chełmsko Śląskie in Lower Silesia

People
A. Thomas Schomberg, American sculptor
Alexander Schomberg (1720–1804), Royal Navy captain, son of Meyer
Alexander Wilmot Schomberg (1774–1850), Royal Navy captain, son of Alexander
Arturo Alfonso Schomberg (1874-1938) Puerto Rican historian of the Harlem Renaissance
Charles Schomberg (disambiguation)
Charles Schomberg, 2nd Duke of Schomberg (1645–1693), general in the Prussian, Dutch and British Army
Charles de Schomberg (1601–1656), son of Henri, also Marshal of France
Charles Frederick Schomberg (1815–1874), Royal Navy admiral, son of Alexander Wilmot
Charles Marsh Schomberg (1779–1835), Royal Navy captain, colonial governor, son of Alexander
Frederick Schomberg, 1st Duke of Schomberg (1615–1690/6–1690), marshal of France and a general in the English and Portuguese Army
George Augustus Schomberg (1821–1907), British Royal Marines officer
Henri de Schomberg (1575–1632), Marshal of France during the reign of Louis XIII
Hermann Schomberg (1907–1975), German film and television actor
Isaac Schomberg (1753–1813), controversial officer of the British Royal Navy
Meinhardt Schomberg, 3rd Duke of Schomberg (1641–1719), general in the service of Prince William of Orange (later King William III of England)
Meyer Löw Schomberg (1690–1761), German-Jewish physician who moved to London
Otto Schomberg (1864–1927), American baseball player
Ralph Schomberg (1714–1792), British doctor 18th century doctor, son of Meyer
Schomberg Kerr, 9th Marquess of Lothian (1833–1900), styled Lord Schomberg Kerr until 1870, was a British diplomat and Conservative politician
Schomberg Kerr McDonnell (1861–1915), British Army officer, politician and civil servant

Other uses
Schomberg (1855), a cargo ship
Schomberg House, London
Schomberg House, Belfast,  the headquarters of the Orange Order
Duke of Schomberg, a title in the Peerage of England

See also
Shamberg (disambiguation)
Schaumburg, a district of Lower Saxony, Germany
Schomburg (disambiguation)
Schönberg (disambiguation)
Schomberg Cougars, a Canadian ice hockey team
Schomberg Observation Tower, a German observation tower

Jewish surnames